Keith McDonald may refer to:

Keith McDonald (baseball) (born 1973), former St. Louis Cardinals baseball player
Keith McDonald (footballer) (1929–1990), former Essendon footballer

See also
Keith MacDonald (1927–2021), Canadian politician
Keith Macdonald (1933–2021), Scottish rugby union player